Doni Tata Pradita (born 21 January 1990 in Sleman, Special Region of Yogyakarta, Indonesia) is an Indonesian motorcycle racer who raced in the 2013 Moto2 World Championship. In 2008, he raced for Yamaha Pertamina Indonesia Team in the  250cc Grand Prix World Championship. Doni is the first Indonesian rider ever to participate in a 250cc Grand Prix World Championship race & remains the only Indonesian rider to score points in intermediate class so far.

Career

Early years
Starring in underbone motorcycle racing in Indonesia from an early age, Doni won two consecutive championships (2003, 2004) in the Novice Class of the Yamaha regional underbone 110cc 4T race series, the Yamaha Asean Cup.

125cc, 250cc World Championships
He got wildcard in year 2005 – 2007 at class 125 & 250 cc 2005 Malaysia. In 2007, he took part in the GP250 class of the All Japan Road Race Championship. In , he raced in the 250cc Grand Prix World Championship and managed to score 1 point from 16 races.

Supersport World Championship
In 2009, he took part in the Supersport World Championship with YZF Yamaha Team and scored 8 points from 12 races.

Moto2 World Championship
After three years in the Asia Road Racing Championship – where he won the 2012 Asian Supersport Championship – Doni signed a contract with Federal Oil Gresini Moto2 for 2013. He was ranked 28th in the final standings.

Comeback to Racing
Doni Tata made a return to motor racing on international level after 4 years of absence by competing in 2017 Suzuka 4 Hours. He rode for Akeno Speed Yamaha Team, aboard a Yamaha YZF-R6 with local Japanese rider Soichiro Minamimoto. The pair finished 2nd in the race.

Career statistics

Grand Prix motorcycle racing

By season

By class

By year
(key)

Supersport World Championship

By season

By year

References

External links

 

1990 births
250cc World Championship riders
Supersport World Championship riders
Living people
Indonesian motorcycle racers
Moto2 World Championship riders
People from Sleman Regency
Sportspeople from Special Region of Yogyakarta